The mixed doubles event  in bowling at the 2009 World Games took place on 20 July at the Happy Bowling Alley.

Competition format
A total of 23 pairs entered the competition. Best three duets from preliminary round qualifies to the finals.

Results

Preliminary

Finals

References

External links
 Results on IWGA website

Bowling at the 2009 World Games